Last of the Summer Wine's eighth series originally aired on BBC1 between 30 December 1984 and 17 March 1985. All episodes from this series were written by Roy Clarke and produced and directed by Alan J. W. Bell.

The eighth series was released on DVD in region 2 as a combined box set with series 7 on 3 March 2008.

Outline
The trio in this series consisted of:

First appearances

Crusher (1984–1987)
Howard Sibshaw (1985–2010)
Pearl Sibshaw (1985–2010)
Marina (1985–2010)

Returning this series

Wesley Pegden (1982, 1984–2002)

Last appearances

Foggy Dewhurst (1976–1985, 1990–1997)

List of episodes
Christmas Special (1984)

Regular series

DVD release
The box set for series 7 and 8 was released by Universal Playback in March 2008.

The region 2 DVD contains edited episodes for The Loxley Lozenge and Catching Digby's Donkey. Both episodes are unedited on the region 1 DVD release.

Notes

References

External links
Series 8 at the Internet Movie Database

Last of the Summer Wine series
1985 British television seasons
1984 British television seasons